Joe Joyce (born 7 February 1994) is an English-born, Irish-qualified rugby union player. He plays lock for English Premiership Rugby side Bristol Bears. 
He is lovingly known as "The King of the Mead" by fans after a commentator coined the phrase.
He has played over 100 games for Bristol and scored 8 tries.

Amateur career
He featured in England Schools & Clubs U18s & U19s as well as playing for Filton College RFC.

Professional career
He has played over 100 times for Bristol Bears and played four games in the Bears' 2016–17 season when they were relegated from the Premiership. Joyce joined the Bristol Bears Academy ahead of the 2012/2013 season. He was a member of the PDG Gold group before graduating into the full-time and made his league debut Bristol Bears in the English Premiership in the 2014/2015 season. In 2018 Joyce won the Players' Player of the Year award. He is signed to Bristol through the 2022 season. From the 2023–2024 season, he will play for Connacht Rugby.

References

External links
Bristol Bears Profile
ItsRugby Player Profile

1994 births
Living people
Rugby union people in England
English rugby union players
Bristol Bears players
Rugby union locks
Rugby union players from Bristol